Nicobium is a genus of death-watch beetles in the family Ptinidae. There are about five described species in Nicobium.

Species
These five species belong to the genus Nicobium:
 Nicobium castaneum (Olivier, 1790) i c g b
 Nicobium schneideri Reitter, 1878 g
 Nicobium velatum (Wollaston, 1854) g
 Nicobium villosum (Brulle, 1838) g
 Nicobium zuzartei Bercedo & Arnáiz, 2007 g
Data sources: i = ITIS, c = Catalogue of Life, g = GBIF, b = Bugguide.net

References

Further reading

 
 
 

Anobiinae
Articles created by Qbugbot